Frank Whitehead is a Canadian politician. Formerly a chief of the Opaskwayak Cree Nation in northern Manitoba and a political advisor to Assembly of Manitoba Chiefs head Ron Evans, he was elected to the Legislative Assembly of Manitoba in a by-election on March 24, 2009, representing the electoral district of The Pas as a member of the New Democratic Party of Manitoba.

Whitehead was reelected in the 2011 general election.

He resigned on May 16, 2014 citing health reasons.

Electoral record

References

Year of birth missing (living people)
Living people
New Democratic Party of Manitoba MLAs
Indigenous leaders in Manitoba
First Nations politicians
Cree people
21st-century Canadian politicians
People from Northern Region, Manitoba